HMS Mohawk was a  of the Royal Navy in service from 1963. She was named after a tribe of Native Americans located in southeast Canada and New York State. Mohawk was scrapped in 1983.

Design and construction
The Tribal-, or Type 81-class, frigates were developed in the mid-1950s as a General Purpose frigate, capable of use in both anti-submarine and anti-aircraft duties in a full-scale war, while serving for Cold War policing duties in peace-time, in particular to replace the old s serving in the Persian Gulf.

Displacement was  standard and  full load. Propulsion was by a single-shaft Combined steam and gas (COSAG) arrangement, effectively half of the powerplant of the s.

The ships were fitted with two QF 4.5-in (113 mm) Mark 5 guns, salvaged from scrapped Second World War destroyers, mounted fore and aft. It was intended to fit two Seacat anti-aircraft missile launchers, but these were not ready in time, and Gurkha completed with two 40 mm Bofors guns instead, with Seacat replacing the Bofors guns on refit. For anti-submarine and anti-ship duties, a hangar and flight deck for a single Westland Wasp helicopter was fitted, while a Limbo anti-submarine mortar provided close-in anti-submarine armament.  Mohawk was fitted with a large Type 965 long range air search radar on a lattice foremast, with a Type 993 short range air/surface target indicating radar and Type 978 navigation radar also fitted. An MRS3 fire control system was carried to direct the 4.5-inch guns. The ship had a sonar suite of Type 177 medium range search sonar, Type 162 bottom search and Type 170 attack sonar. The ship had a crew of 253 officers and other ranks.

Mohawk was built by Vickers, of Barrow-in-Furness, at a cost of £4,705,000. She was laid down on 23 December 1960, was launched on 5 April 1962 and commissioned on 29 November 1963. Her construction had been disrupted by a labour dispute.

Operational Service
In 1965, Mohawk deployed to the Persian Gulf. She joined the Beira Patrol, intended to enforce an oil blockade of Rhodesia, in 1966. The following year, Mohawk deployed to the West Indies and the Mediterranean, becoming the Gibraltar guardship in 1968. By 1969, Mohawk had returned to the West Indies.

Mohawk underwent a conversion to accommodate her planned utilisation as a training ship. The refit entailed the removal of Mohawks aft 4.5-inch gun and the conversion of her hangar to a classroom, but the process was abandoned. In 1973, Mohawk and the destroyer  relieved the destroyer  and frigate  in the Far East Squadron. Mohawk contributed to the Beira Patrol before returning to Britain in 1973. Later that year she embarked on a tour of the Norwegian coast.

In 1974, Mohawk served in the West Indies and the Mediterranean. In 1977, Mohawk joined Naval On-call Force of the Mediterranean (NAVOCFORMED), a NATO multi-national squadron. Later that year, Mohawk formed part of a task force designated "Group 6", led by the cruiser , that toured the Middle and Far East. During the group's return journey the following year, Mohawk suffered hull damage in the port of Valletta, Malta after slipping her moorings early.

In 1979, Mohawk was reduced to the reserve and allocated to the Standby Squadron. After being placed on the disposal list in 1981. Mohawk was sold for scrap and broken up at Cairnryan.

Notes

Publications
 
 
 
 
 
 

 

Ships built in Barrow-in-Furness
Tribal-class frigates
1962 ships